Hettiarachige Mahes Goonatilleke (born 16 August 1952, Kegalle) is a former Sri Lankan cricketer, who played five Test matches and six ODIs as wicket-keeper during 1981 and 1982 – being Sri Lanka's first wicketkeeper in Test cricket.

International career
He is regarded by many as the finest wicket-keeper produced by the island nation and even made 56 against Pakistan as an opener in Faisalabad. Goonatilleke had a chance to become a regular wicket-keeper for Sri Lanka, but he chose to tour South Africa in the 1982/83 season, and that disqualified him from playing international cricket.

References
 Cricinfo page

1952 births
Living people
Sri Lanka One Day International cricketers
Sri Lanka Test cricketers
Sri Lankan cricketers
All-Ceylon cricketers
Alumni of St. Anthony's College, Kandy
Wicket-keepers